Mlele District is one of the five districts of the Katavi Region of Tanzania.

Mlele District was formed in 2012 out of part of Mpanda District.

Administrative subdivisions
Mlele District is administratively divided into twenty-three wards: 

 Ikuba
 Ilela
 Inyonga
 Itenka
 Kapalala
 Kasansa
 Kasokola
 Kibaoni
 Litapunga
 Machimboni
 Magamba
 Majimoto
 Mamba
 Mbede
 Mtapenda
 Mwamapuli
 Nsekwa
 Nsimbo
 Sitalike
 Ugalla
 Urwira
 Usevya
 Utende

References

Districts of Katavi Region
States and territories established in 2012